Szczepanów is a Polish toponym derived from  "Szczepan"  - a variant of "Stephan". Hence, places getting that name is likely to be the result of a person named Szczepan having had a significant role in local history.

The name may refer to the following places in Poland:
Szczepanów, Kamienna Góra County in Lower Silesian Voivodeship (south-west Poland)
Szczepanów, Środa Śląska County in Lower Silesian Voivodeship (south-west Poland)
Szczepanów, Świdnica County in Lower Silesian Voivodeship (south-west Poland)
Szczepanów, Lesser Poland Voivodeship (south Poland)
Szczepanów, Świętokrzyskie Voivodeship (south-central Poland)
Szczepanów, Greater Poland Voivodeship (west-central Poland)
Szczepanów, Lubusz Voivodeship (west Poland)